Umuara is a genus of South American anyphaenid sac spiders first described by Antônio Brescovit in 1997.

Species
 it contains six species:
Umuara fasciata (Blackwall, 1862) – Venezuela, Brazil
Umuara freddyi Oliveira & Brescovit, 2015 – Brazil
Umuara junin Brescovit, 1997 – Peru
Umuara juquia Brescovit, 1997 – Brazil
Umuara pydanieli Brescovit, 1997 – Brazil
Umuara xingo Oliveira & Brescovit, 2015 – Brazil

References

Anyphaenidae
Araneomorphae genera
Spiders of South America
Taxa named by Antônio Brescovit